is a city located in Aichi Prefecture, Japan. , the city had an estimated population of 44,589 in 18,185 households and a population density of 910 persons per km². The between of the border, and neighboring town of Kanie.

Geography

Yatomi is located in the coastal flatlands of far western Aichi Prefecture, bordering Mie Prefecture on the west. It has a short coastline with Mikawa Bay on the Pacific Ocean to the southeast.

Climate
The city has a climate characterized by hot and humid summers, and relatively mild winters (Köppen climate classification Cfa).  The average annual temperature in Yatomi is 15.6 °C. The average annual rainfall is 1677 mm with September as the wettest month. The temperatures are highest on average in August, at around 27.7 °C, and lowest in January, at around 4.5 °C.

Demographics
Per Japanese census data, the population of Yatomi has grown steadily over the past 60 years.

Surrounding municipalities
Aichi Prefecture
Aisai
Kanie
Tobishima
Mie Prefecture
Kuwana
Kisosaki

History

Middle Ages
The area name of Yatomi appears in Kamakura period documents, as part of ancient Owari Province.

Early modern period
During the Edo period, the area was noted for raising ornamental goldfish.

Late modern period
During the Meiji period, the area was organized into villages under Kasai District, Aichi Prefecture, with the establishment of the modern municipalities system.
Kasai District later became Ama District, Aichi.
Yatomi was proclaimed a town on August 26, 1903.

Contemporary history
The Isewan Typhoon of September 26, 1959 created extensive damage to the area.
Efforts to merge Yatomi with the neighboring town of Kanie failed in 2004 over a dispute on the naming of the new entity.

The city of Yatomi was founded on April 1, 2006, from the merger between the former town of Yatomi, absorbing the village of Jūshiyama (both from Ama District).

Government

Yatomi has a mayor-council form of government with a directly elected mayor and a unicameral city legislature of 16 members. The city contributes two members to the Aichi Prefectural Assembly.  In terms of national politics, the city is part of Aichi District 9 of the lower house of the Diet of Japan.

External relations

Twin towns – Sister cities

National
Disaster Alliance city
Urayasu（Chiba Prefecture, Kantō region）
since September 27, 2012

Education

Schools
Yatomi has eight public elementary schools and three public junior high schools operated by the city government, and one public high school operated by the Aichi Prefectural Board of Education. There is also one private high school.

Economy
Yatomi is a regional commercial center, and is noted for hothouse agriculture. Main agricultural products  include rice, wheat, lettuce, tomatoes, and carnations.

Transportation

Railways

Conventional lines
Central Japan Railway Company
Kansai Main Line：-  -
Kintetsu
Nagoya Line：-  - 
Meitetsu
Bisai Line： –  -

Roads

Expressways
 Higashi-Meihan Expressway
Isewangan Expressway

Japan National Route

Seaways

Seaport
Port of Nagoya
Nabeta wharf

Notable people from Yatomi 
 Ōnishiki Daigorō, Sumo Wrestler
 Umanosuke Ueda, professional wrestler and sports commentator

Local attractions

 Nagoya Racecourse

Parks
Tatsuta polder sluice gates
Yatomi Wild Bird Sanctuary
Mitsumata-pond park

References

External links 

  

Cities in Aichi Prefecture
Populated coastal places in Japan
Yatomi, Aichi